The 2009–10 Vanderbilt Commodores men's basketball team represented Vanderbilt University in the 2009–10 NCAA Division I men's college basketball season. The team competed in the East Division of the Southeastern Conference, as it has since the SEC expanded to 12 schools in 1991. The team was led by Kevin Stallings, in his tenth year as head coach, and played their home games at their home since 1952, Memorial Gymnasium on the school's campus in Nashville, Tennessee. They finished the season 24–9, 12–4 in SEC play. They lost in the semifinals of the 2010 SEC men's basketball tournament to Mississippi State. The Commodores received an at-large bid to the 2010 NCAA Division I men's basketball tournament, earning a 4 seed in the west region, where they lost to 13 seed Murray State in the first round on a last second buzzer beater.

Roster and individual statistics 

1 Walk-on.

Source: ESPN.com

2009-10 schedule and results

|-
!colspan=9| Regular season
			

					

									

|-
!colspan=9| 2010 SEC tournament

|-
!colspan=9| 2010 NCAA tournament

References

Vanderbilt Commodores men's basketball seasons
Vanderbilt
Vanderbilt
Vanderbilt Commodores men's basketball
Vanderbilt Commodores men's basketball